The Four Musketeers, named after a 1921 film adaptation of Alexandre Dumas' novel, were French tennis players who were top competitors of the game during the second half of the 1920s and early 1930s, winning 20 Grand Slam titles and 23 Grand Slam doubles. They also led France to six straight Davis Cup wins, 1927–32, in an era when Cup matches enjoyed a prestige similar to today's FIFA World Cup finals. At its creation in 1927, the men's French Open trophy was named the Coupe des Mousquetaires in honour of the quartet.

The Musketeers
The Musketeers were:
Jean Borotra (1898–1994)
Jacques Brugnon (1895–1978)
Henri Cochet (1901–1987)
René Lacoste (1904–1996)

While Brugnon was primarily a doubles specialist, Borotra, Cochet, and Lacoste won many singles titles. Between them, they won three United States Championships at Forest Hills, six consecutive Wimbledon titles from 1924 through 1929, and 10 titles in 11 years at the French Championships, 1922 through 1932 (up to and including 1924, though, the tournament was only open to members of French tennis clubs, therefore wasn't a major tournament until 1925). From 1926 until 1930 a musketeer, Lacoste or Cochet, was ranked No. 1 in the world and in 1926 and 1927 all four musketeers were ranked in the top-10.  The only player capable of challenging their dominance was the great American Bill Tilden (world number-one from 1920 until 1926, when Lacoste took over the position). The Musketeers were finally eclipsed by the arrival of Ellsworth Vines, Fred Perry and Jack Crawford on the international tennis scene in the first half of the 1930s.

Legacy
The success of The Four Musketeers in winning the 1927 Davis Cup against the United States was directly responsible for the decision by the French Tennis Federation to build the Roland Garros venue at Porte d'Auteuil. The four men were national icons in France and all of them lived to be at least 83 years old, basking in glory for many years after their retirement from tennis. They were simultaneously inducted into the International Tennis Hall of Fame in Newport, Rhode Island, in 1976.

The New Musketeers, (Nouveaux Mousquetaires or néo-Mousquetaires) coined in L'Équipe and adopted by the French press, refers to the present-day squad of star players headlined by Jo-Wilfried Tsonga, Gaël Monfils, Richard Gasquet and Gilles Simon. In 2008 France boasted four Top-20 players, a feat never before achieved since computer rankings were established in 1973. This configuration of the same four players in the Top-20 has been reproduced in mid-2011, in early 2012 and early 2016.

See also

 France Davis Cup team
 List of Davis Cup champions
 List of Grand Slam men's singles champions
 List of Grand Slam men's doubles champions
 Christian Boussus, sometimes referred as the "Fifth Musketeer".
 List of male tennis players
 Big Three

References

Sources

 
 

French male tennis players
Nicknamed groups of tennis players
Quartets